Fusinus boucheti is a species of sea snail, a marine gastropod mollusk in the family Fasciolariidae, the spindle snails, the tulip snails and their allies.

Description
The length of the shell attains 45.9 mm.

Distribution
This marine species occurs in the Atlantic Ocean off Morocco.

References

 Hadorn R. & Ryall P.S. (1999). A new species and a new subspecies of deep-water Fusinus (Gastropoda: Fasciolariidae) from the eastern Atlantic. Argonauta 13(1): 31-38
 Gofas, S.; Le Renard, J.; Bouchet, P. (2001). Mollusca. in: Costello, M.J. et al. (eds), European Register of Marine Species: a check-list of the marine species in Europe and a bibliography of guides to their identification. Patrimoines Naturels. 50: 180-213

boucheti
Gastropods described in 1999